James Arthur Chamberlin (May 23, 1915 – March 8, 1981) was a Canadian engineer who contributed to the design of the Canadian Avro Arrow, NASA's Gemini spacecraft and the Apollo program. In addition to his pioneering air and space efforts, he is often cited as an example of Canadian brain drain to the U.S. In the early 1960s, he was one of the key people that proposed and moved that Lunar Orbit Rendezvous (LOR) was the best option for landing a crew on the Moon, the method eventually used on Apollo lunar landing missions. He left NASA in 1970 and worked for McDonnell Douglas, in their Houston offices, until his death in 1981.

Early life
Chamberlin was born in Kamloops, British Columbia on May 23, 1915, the son of Walter Chamberlin and Theresa Goldie. His father was killed at the Battle of Vimy Ridge, in 1917. Having maintained a keen interest in model aircraft during high school at the University of Toronto Schools, he took mechanical engineering degrees at the University of Toronto (1936) and Imperial College London (1939).

Career
Chamberlin began his engineering career with the British aircraft company (and later ejection seat manufacturers) Martin-Baker before returning to Canada. He worked on the production of the British Avro Anson at Federal Aircraft Ltd. in Montreal (1940–1941), and later, on training and anti-submarine aircraft as chief engineer at Clarke Ruse Aircraft in Dartmouth, Nova Scotia (1941–1942). His longest tenure began as a research engineer (1942–1945) at Noorduyn Aircraft in Montreal, working on the Norseman and serving in this position until the end of the Second World War.

Avro Canada
In February 1946, Chamberlin joined Avro Aircraft Ltd. in Toronto, the Canadian subsidiary of the British Avro, itself part of the Hawker Siddeley Group, where Chamberlin was chief aerodynamicist on the C102 Jetliner and CF-100 Canuck jet interceptor. Later, as chief of technical design for the CF-105 Avro Arrow jet interceptor, he generated many of the ideas that would make the design famous.

NASA
Following the Canadian government's cancellation of the Avro Arrow project in 1959, Chamberlin led a team of 25 engineers from Avro who joined NASA's Space Task Group. This group eventually grew to 32 former Avro engineers, collectively known as the "Avro Group", who joined NASA and become emblematic of what many Canadians viewed as a brain drain to the United States.

As head of engineering for Project Mercury, chief designer and NASA's first Project Manager for the Gemini spacecraft built by McDonnell Aircraft, and then troubleshooter on Apollo, Chamberlin played an instrumental role in creating and implementing the first three generations of American crewed spacecraft.

While designing the Gemini spacecraft in 1961, Chamberlin proposed that Gemini be paired with a "bug" that would land a single astronaut on the Moon. Chamberlin had been impressed with NASA engineer John Houbolt's advocacy of Lunar orbit rendezvous as the method to go to the Moon. Although Chamberlin's idea of flying Gemini to the Moon was rejected, it helped lead NASA to its decision in 1962 to use Lunar Orbit Rendezvous in the Apollo program, which involved using the Lunar Module (LM) to descend to the lunar surface.

Chamberlin was described by space historian David Baker as "probably one of the most brilliant men ever to work for NASA."
Chamberlin left NASA in 1970 to join McDonnell Douglas Astronautics, where he prepared an ultimately unsuccessful space shuttle bid before becoming technical director for the company's facility at the Johnson Space Center in Houston, a position he held until his death on March 8, 1981. He and his wife had a son and a daughter.

Honors
NASA awarded Chamberlin its Exceptional Scientific Achievement, Exceptional Service and Exceptional Engineering Achievement medals. Chamberlin was a Professional Engineer of the   Province of Ontario, a member of the Institute of Aeronautical Scientists and an Associate Fellow of the Canadian Aeronautical Institute. The minor planet 14148 Jimchamberlin, discovered at Kitt Peak National Observatory in 1998, is named in his honor. In 2001, he was inducted into Canada's Aviation Hall of Fame. In 2019, Canada Post issued stamps commemorating Canadian contributions to the Apollo 11 mission which included Chamberlin's likeness.

References

Bibliography

 Baker, David. The History of Manned Space Flight. New York: Crown Publishers, 1985, First edition 1982. .
 Gainor, Chris. Arrows to the Moon: Avro's Engineers and the Space Race. Burlington, Ontario, Canada: Apogee Books, 2001, .
 Hacker, Barton; James Grimwood. On the Shoulders of Titans: A History of Project Gemini. Washington, D.C.: National Aeronautics and Space Administration, 1977. .
 Harvey, Brian. Russian Planetary Exploration: History, Development, Legacy and Prospects. New York: Springer, 2007. .
 "Lunar orbit rendezvous: news conference on Apollo plans at NASA headquarters on July 11, 1962." NASA, 1962.
 Murray, Charles; Catherine Bly Cox. Apollo: The Race to the Moon. New York: Simon & Schuster, 1989. .
 Nelson, Craig. Rocket Men: The Epic Story of the First Men on the Moon. New York: Viking, 2009. .
 Stewart, Greig. Shutting Down the National Dream: A.V. Roe and the Tragedy of the Avro Arrow. Toronto: McGraw-Hill-Ryerson, 1991. .
 Whitcomb, Randall. Cold War Tech War. Burlington, Ontario, Canada: Apogee Books, 2008. .
 Wilford. John. We Reach the Moon: The New York Times Story of Man's Greatest Adventure. New York: Bantam Paperbacks, 1973, First edition 1969. .
 Woods, W. David. How Apollo Flew to the Moon. New York: Springer, 2008. .

External links
 Arrow Recovery Canada
 

1915 births
1981 deaths
20th-century Canadian engineers
Alumni of Imperial College London
People from Kamloops
University of Toronto alumni
NASA people